Disco Not Disco 2 is a compilation album from  the Disco Not Disco series released by Strut Records in 2002. As with the first compilation, this album is a probe to experimental side of disco and punk genres and underground music scene in general. The second volume is more electro and dance oriented and features electro pioneer Alexander Robotnick ("Problèmes D'Amour"), post-punk and dance-rock music groups like Laid Back, Material and The Clash, Can, and Arthur Russell.

As with the first instalment in the series, it was compiled by British DJ and music producer Joey Negro.

Reception
The Allmusic review by Andy Kellman awarded the album 4 stars stating "Despite all the advances made in dance music in the decades that followed the greatness featured here, the lasting value is undeniable."
The Stylus Magazine review by Scott Plagenhoef gave the album B− saying "So bag the preconceptions and get on the floor—embrace these beats without process and listen without prejudice. And while you're at it, grab the stronger Disco (Not Disco) as well".

Track listing

Personnel

"White Horse"
Producers: Laidback

"Problèmes D'Amour" 
Vocals: Martine Michellod
Vocals, Electric guitar, programmed by: Maurizio Dami
Recorded by: Marzio Benelli
Producer: Arlo Bigazzi, Giampiero Bigazzi, Maurizio Dami

"Bostich" (Extended Dance Version)  
Percussion: Beat Ash
Remix: Ian Tregoning
Producer: Yello

"Aspectacle" (Holger Czukay Edit)  
Editing: Holger Czukay

"Ciguri" 
Drums, electric guitar, vocals: Fred Maher
Guitar: Robert Quine
Bass guitar: Bill Laswell
Vocals, synthesizer: Michael Beinhorn

"Get Down" 
Producer: Noel Williams

"Timewarp" 
Producer: Eddy Grant  
 
"Let's Go Swimming" 
Editing: Killer Whale 
Producer: Mark Freedman
Producer, composer: Arthur Russell

"Sting" (Part One) 
Producer:  J. & N.

"Fourteen Days"  
Arrangement: Jeff Schack
Mixing, producer: Ray "Pinky" Velazquez

"This Is Radio Clash" 
Producer: The Clash
Saxophone/Electric Saxophone: Gary Barnacle

References

2002 compilation albums
Experimental rock compilation albums
Post-punk compilation albums
Post-disco compilation albums
Electro compilation albums